Maxwell Freeman Yalden,  (April 12, 1930 – February 9, 2015) was a Canadian civil servant and diplomat.

Born in Toronto, Ontario, he received a Bachelor of Arts degree from the University of Toronto in 1952, a Master of Arts degree in 1954 and a Ph.D in 1956 from the University of Michigan. He joined the Department of External Affairs in 1956. From 1969 to 1973, he was assistant under-secretary of state and in 1973 was deputy minister of communications.

He was the second Commissioner of Official Languages from 1977 until 1984. He was Ambassador to Belgium and Luxembourg from 1984 to 1987. From 1987 to 1996 he was the Chief Commissioner of the Canadian Human Rights Commission. In 1996 he was elected to a four-year term a member of the United Nations Human Rights Committee. He was re-elected for a second term in 2000.

In 1988 he was made an Officer of the Order of Canada and was promoted to Companion in 1999. In 1998 he was awarded an Honorary LL.D. from Carleton University.

He died at Ottawa, Ontario, at age 84, from pneumonia complications.

References

 
 
 

1930 births
2015 deaths
20th-century Canadian civil servants
Companions of the Order of Canada
United Nations Human Rights Committee members
People from Toronto
University of Toronto alumni
University of Michigan alumni
Ambassadors of Canada to Belgium
Ambassadors of Canada to Luxembourg
Commissioners of Official Languages (Canada)
Canadian officials of the United Nations
Canadian civil servants